Cappeln is an unincorporated community in St. Charles County, in the U.S. state of Missouri.

History
A post office called Cappeln was established in 1870, and remained in operation until 1907. The community takes its name from Cappeln, in Germany.

References

Unincorporated communities in St. Charles County, Missouri
Unincorporated communities in Missouri